The 2015–16 season is Dreams Metro Gallery's debut season in the top-tier division in Hong Kong football. They will compete in the Premier League, Senior Challenge Shield and FA Cup in this season.

Key events
 17 July 2015: Hong Kong defender Leung Kwok Wai joins the club from Eastern on a free transfer.
 17 July 2015: Hong Kong goalkeeper Pang Tsz Kin joins the club from Yuen Long on a free transfer.
 17 July 2015: Hong Kong defender Wong Tsz Ho, Lee Ka Wah, Vasudeva das Lilley Nunez and Yiu Ho Ming join the club on loan from Eastern until the end of the season.
 17 July 2015: Hong Kong midfielder Li Ka Chun, Eugene Mbome, Lau Ho Lam and Tse Long Hin join the club on loan from Eastern until the end of the season.
 17 July 2015: Hong Kong goalkeeper Li Yat Chun joins the club on loan from Eastern until the end of the season.
 17 July 2015: Hong Kong midfielder Chu Siu Kei, Chung Wai Keung, Lai Lok Yin, Siu Chun Ming, Lui Wai Chiu and Chow Win Yin join the club from Metro Gallery Sun Source on a free transfer.
 17 July 2015: Hong Kong defender Lo Tsz Hin and Siu Pui Lam join the club from Metro Gallery Sun Source on a free transfer.
 17 July 2015: Japanese striker Kenji Fukuda joins the club from YFCMD on a free transfer. Cameroon striker Paul Ngue joins the club from Metro Gallery Sun Source on a free transfer.
 17 July 2015: Hong Kong goalkeeper To Chun Kiu joins the club from YFCMD on a free transfer.
 17 July 2015: Spanish Pablo Gallardo joins the club from Arroyo CP on a free transfer.
 2 September 2015: Brazilian defender Clayton Michel Afonso joins the club on loan from Eastern until the end of the season.

Players

Squad information

Ordered by squad number.
LPLocal player; FPForeign player; NRNon-registered player

Transfers

In

Summer

Out

Summer

Loan In

Summer

Loan Out

Summer

Club

Coaching staff

Squad statistics

Overall Stats
{|class="wikitable" style="text-align: center;"
|-
!width="100"|
!width="60"|League
!width="60"|Senior Shield
!width="60"|FA Cup
!width="60"|Total Stats
|-
|align=left|Games played    ||  0  ||  0  ||  0  || 0
|-
|align=left|Games won       ||  0  ||  0  ||  0  || 0
|-
|align=left|Games drawn     ||  0  ||  0  ||  0  || 0
|-
|align=left|Games lost      ||  0  ||  0  ||  0  || 0
|-
|align=left|Goals for       ||  0  ||  0  ||  0  || 0
|-
|align=left|Goals against   ||  0  ||  0  ||  0  || 0
|- =
|align=left|Players used    ||  0  ||  0  ||  0  || 0
|-
|align=left|Yellow cards    ||  0  ||  0  ||  0  || 0
|-
|align=left|Red cards       ||  0  ||  0  ||  0  || 0
|-

Appearances and goals
Key

No. = Squad number

Pos. = Playing position

Nat. = Nationality

Apps = Appearances

GK = Goalkeeper

DF = Defender

MF = Midfielder

FW = Forward

Numbers in parentheses denote appearances as substitute. Players with number struck through and marked  left the club during the playing season.

Top scorers

The list is sorted by shirt number when total goals are equal.

Disciplinary record
Includes all competitive matches.Players listed below made at least one appearance for Southern first squad during the season.

Substitution Record
Includes all competitive matches.

Last updated: 30 July 2015

Captains

Competitions

Overall

First Division League

Classification

Results summary

References

Hong Kong football clubs 2015–16 season